

 	
Johann Schlemmer (18 January 1893 – 26 June 1973) was a German general during World War II who commanded the LXXV Army Corps. He was a recipient of the Knight's Cross of the Iron Cross with Oak Leaves. Schlemmer surrendered to Allied troops in Italy in 1945.

Life and career
Johann Schlemmer was born in Nesselwang in Bavaria on 18 January 1893. Joining the German Army in 1913, he served in World War I as a lieutenant in the Bavarian Artillery. He remained in the army after 1918. At the outbreak of World War II he commanded first a battalion, then a regiment, of mountain artillery, before being promoted to general officer rank, commanding the 134th Infantry Division.

He ended the war as a General of Mountain Troops, commanding the LXXV Army Corps in Italy. He surrendered to Allied troops in Italy in 1945.

Awards and decorations
 Iron Cross (1914) 2nd Class (9 November 1914) & 1st Class (17 December 1916)
 Clasp to the Iron Cross (1939) 2nd Class (2 October 1939) & 1st Class (25 May 1940)
 German Cross in Gold on 23 January 1942 as Oberst (Colonel) in the 134th Infantry Division
 Knight's Cross of the Iron Cross with Oak Leaves
 Knight's Cross on 21 April 1942 as Generalmajor and commander of 134th Infantry Division
 369th Oak Leaves on 18 January 1944 as Generalleutnant and commander of 134th Infantry Division

References
Citations

Bibliography

 

 

 
 

1893 births
1973 deaths
People from Ostallgäu
People from the Kingdom of Bavaria
German Army personnel of World War I
Generals of Mountain Troops
Recipients of the Gold German Cross
Recipients of the Knight's Cross of the Iron Cross with Oak Leaves
German prisoners of war in World War II held by the United States
Military personnel from Bavaria